The 1997 Women's Intercontinental Cup was a qualifier for the 1998 Women's Hockey World Cup and was held in the Magamba Stadium in Harare, Zimbabwe, from Friday 1 August to Tuesday 12 August 1997. Twelve nations took part, divided into two groups of six in the preliminary round. The top six teams joined Argentina, Olympic champions Australia, Germany, South Korea, the United States and hosts the Netherlands.

Team squads

Dana Anderson, Sue Armstrong, Nicole Colaco, Lisa Faust, Sarah Forbes (gk), Aoibhinn Grimes, Chris Hunter, Laurelee Kopeck, Amy MacFarlane, Karen MacNeill, Veronica Planella, Gillian Sewell, Carla Somerville, Sue Tingley, Krista Thompson (gk), and Candy Thomson. Head Coach: Dru Marshall.

Tingonleima Chanu (gk), Helen Mary (gk), Sandeep Khaur, Shashi Bala (captain), Maristella Tirkey, Mukta Xalco, Sita Gussain, Sumrai Tete, Sunita Dalal, Nidhi Khullar, Manjinder Kaur, Pritam Thakran, Kamala Dalal, Suraj Lata Devi, Jyoti Sunita Kullu, and Ferdina Ekka. Head coach: Balbir Singh.

Preliminary round

Group A

Group B

Semi finals

Finals 

England wins after penalty strokes

Scotland wins after penalty strokes

South Africa wins after penalty strokes

Final ranking

Remarks 
 The first six (South Africa, New Zealand, Scotland, India, England and China) participated in the 1998 Women's Hockey World Cup in Utrecht, Netherlands.

References

External links 
 Field Hockey Canada
 fihockey

1997
1997 in women's field hockey
H
Sport in Harare
1998 Women's Hockey World Cup
August 1997 sports events in Africa
1997 Women's Intercontinental Cup
20th century in Harare
1997 in Zimbabwean women's sport